José Luis Martínez may refer to:

Politics
 José Luis Olivas Martinez (born 1952), Spanish politician
 José Luis Márquez Martínez (born 1966), Mexican politician
 José Luis Álvarez Martínez (born 1968), Mexican politician

Sports
 José Luis Martínez (basketball) for Real Madrid Baloncesto
 José Luis Martínez (hammer thrower) (1943–2004), Spanish hammer thrower
 José Luis Martínez (footballer) (born 1971), in 1991 FIFA World Youth Championship squads
 Jose Luis Martinez (motocross racer), in 2008 FIM Motocross World Championship
 José Luis Martínez (Paralympian shooter), in Shooting at the 2008 Summer Paralympics – Mixed 50 metre pistol SH1
 José Luis Martínez (runner), Spanish runner in 1962 Ibero-American Games
 José Luis Martínez (shot putter), Spanish shot putter in 1998 Ibero-American Championships in Athletics
 José Luis Martínez (sport shooter) (1926–2014), Spanish sport shooter who competed at the 1968 Summer Olympics
 José Luis Martínez (weightlifter) (born 1968), Spanish Olympic weightlifter
 José Luis Martínez Bazán (1942–2015), Uruguayan referee
 José Luis Martínez Gullotta (born 1984), Argentine football goalkeeper
 José Luis Hernández Martínez (born 1994), Mexican footballer
 José Luis Laguía Martínez (born 1959), Spanish cyclist

Other
 José Luis Martínez Rodríguez (1918–2007), Mexican writer, diplomat, and academic
 José Luis Gómez Martínez (born 1943), Spanish professor
 Jose Luis Martinez (actor), in Malaventura, a 2011 Mexican film

See also
 José Martínez (disambiguation)
 Luis Martínez (disambiguation)